Cliff Park Ormiston Academy (formerly Cliff Park High School) is a coeducational secondary school with academy status, located in the Gorleston-on-Sea area of Great Yarmouth in the English county of Norfolk. The school educates children aged 11 to 16.

History
Previously a foundation school, Cliff Park High School was put into special measures in 2012 following an unsatisfactory Ofsted inspection report. The school exited special measures in 2013 and converted to academy status in January 2014, sponsored by the Ormiston Academies Trust. The most recent Ofsted inspection in September 2016 graded the academy as 'Good'.

Academic results 
In 2016, the academy's Progress 8 score for GCSE results was 0.37, which is above the average Progress 8 for schools in England. 58% of students achieved grades A*-C / 9–4 in GCSE English and Maths.

Notable former pupils
The classical and pop musician, media personality and model Myleene Klass attended the school in the 1990s before becoming a member of the band Hear'Say.

Gregg Lowe, actor in the X-Men films
Simon James Kippen, known as Kip Sabian, a professional wrestler, currently signed to All Elite Wrestling (AEW).

References

External links
Cliff Park Ormiston Academy official website

Secondary schools in Norfolk
Gorleston-on-Sea
Academies in Norfolk
Ormiston Academies